Harrison Moss-Edge (born 1 March 1994) is a New Zealand footballer who plays as a defender or midfielder for Torslanda IK.

Career

Club career

In 2014, Edge joined the youth academy of Dutch side PEC Zwolle. In 2015, he signed for Tuks in South Africa, where he made one league appearance and scored 0 goals. On 13 September 2015, Edge debuted for Tuks during a 0–1 loss to [[Bidvest Wits F.C>|Bidvest Wits]]. In 2017, he trialed for English Premier League club West Brom. Before the 2019 season, Edge signed for Torslanda IK in the Swedish fourth division, where he suffered relegation to the Swedish third division.

International career

Edge is eligible to represent Malaysia internationally through his father.

References

External links
 

New Zealand association footballers
Expatriate footballers in the Netherlands
Living people
Association football midfielders
1994 births
Expatriate soccer players in South Africa
Association football defenders
Expatriate footballers in Sweden
Auckland City FC players
Eastern Suburbs AFC players
Torslanda IK players
Hawke's Bay United FC players
University of Pretoria F.C. players
WaiBOP United players
People from Tauranga